Nathan James Smith (born 3 April 1996) is an English professional footballer who plays as a defender for  club Port Vale, where he has remained since turning professional in June 2014. He has won praise for mental attributes such as bravery, consistency and commitment, as well as for his pace and strength.

Smith spent the 2014–15 season on loan at Stafford Rangers and the 2015–16 season on loan at Torquay United, winning the Player of the season award at Torquay. He made his Football League debut for Port Vale in August 2016, and went on to win the club's Player of the Year award for the 2016–17 relegation season. He helped the club to win promotion out of League Two via the play-offs in 2022.

Early and personal life
Smith grew up in Madeley, Staffordshire and attended Madeley High School. He played for Madeley White Star; he helped his school to win the Sentinel Schools' Shield at Vale Park in 2012. He attended Stoke City games up until the age of sixteen, though stopped supporting the club as an adult. In 2021, he set up a coaching academy in Madeley with Port Vale captain Tom Conlon.

Career
Smith signed his first professional contract with Port Vale in June 2014, with his initial deal running for 12 months. He was loaned out to Northern Premier League Division One South club Stafford Rangers in October 2014. The loan was later extended until the end of the 2014–15 season. He featured 35 times throughout the campaign, scoring one goal.

He joined National League side Torquay United on an initial three-month loan deal in July 2015. He impressed for the "Gulls" and the loan was later extended to cover the whole of the 2015–16 season. He made a total of 44 appearances at Plainmoor and was voted the club's Player of the Season and Young Player of the Season. Manager Kevin Nicholson described him as a "freak of nature".

He made his League One debut for Port Vale on the opening day of the 2016–17 season, in a 0–0 draw with Bradford City on 6 August. His performance saw him named in the Football League Paper's League One Team of the Day. New manager Bruno Ribeiro had described him as the club's standout player during pre-season. He scored his first goal in the Football League on 16 August, with his header proving to be the only goal of the game against Rochdale. His performances saw him nominated for the League One Player of the Month award for August. This led chairman Norman Smurthwaite to open negotiations for a new contract as he admitted Smith was "on a boy's wage compared to the rest of the squad" and Smurthwaite anticipated offers for the player from Championship clubs in the January transfer window. Smith quickly agreed to a new contract to keep him at the club until June 2020. The Football League further recognized his performances by naming him as Young Player of the Month for August. Speaking in February 2017, caretaker manager Michael Brown said that Smith set a good example to his teammates by playing through a hamstring injury. He played every game of the campaign, mostly in a centre-back aoprtnership with Remie Streete, and picked up all five of the club's end of season awards, including the Player of the Year award. However, despite Smith enjoying success on an individual level, Port Vale were in turmoil as they suffered relegation and the chairman subsequently resigned.

Brown was sacked early in the 2017–18 season after Vale slipped in the League Two relegation zone, and his successor, Neil Aspin stated that Smith was a "key player" but could improve in areas such as decision making. He started all 54 of the Vale's matches that season, making it two consecutive seasons of appearing in every game, though admitted he could have played better and that the team's finish of 20th in League Two was not good enough.

After suffering a dip in form at the start of the 2018–19 season, Smith was dropped for the home game with Crawley Town on 18 August, putting to an end his run of 110 consecutive appearances that he had made since his debut two years previously. Smith said he would take being dropped as a learning experience. He returned to the starting line-up and formed a solid partnership with Leon Legge, whilst Connell Rawlinson was moved to right-back. The three centre-backs then went on to form a back three in a 3–5–2 formation, which was instigated after a 6–2 home defeat to Lincoln City on 13 October, and kept four clean sheets by the end of the month. By March he reached 150 appearances for the club before the age of 23, the youngest player to reach this landmark since Billy Paynter in 2005. Having played 51 of the club's 54 matches over the course of the campaign, he was named as Vale's Young Player of the Year for the second time in three years.

He started the 2019–20 season in a central defensive partnership with Legge, though was criticised by Northampton Town manager Keith Curle for allegedly manhandling  striker Harry Smith. On 25 August, he scored his first goal in 20 months in a 5–2 defeat at Grimsby Town. Speaking in January, club captain Legge said that Smith was more confident and much improved from the previous campaign. His form led to rumours on social media of him making a move to Birmingham City. He lost his first-team place to Shaun Brisley in January due to injury, but impressed coach Danny Pugh with his performance at right-back in a 3–0 win over Colchester United on 15 February. He was offered a new contract after he ended the campaign with five goals in 41 appearances. Tom Pope nominated Smith as his Player of the Year for the 2019–20 season in his column in The Sentinel. Smith signed a new two-year contract in July 2020, despite interest from League One clubs. He said that he stayed due to his faith in the new ownership of Kevin and Carol Shanahan, his family being settled in the area, and the offer of stability during the COVID-19 recession.

Smith remained a consistent member of the defence during the 2020–21 season, only missing a run of games when he had to isolate after coming into contact with someone who has tested positive for COVID-19. Speaking in April, recently appointed manager Darrell Clarke described him as a "genuine winner" following a good run of defensive form for the team. Smith scored four goals from 50 appearances and was singled out for praise by Clarke again at the end of the season, who said that "Nathan Smith is the sort of character I want in this football club".

A consistent part of the back three during the 2021–22 season, he caused an opposition player to be sent off in two successive games as Crawley Town's Joel Lynch and Accrington Stanley's Colby Bishop were both dismissed for elbowing Smith in off-the-ball incidents. He started in the play-off final at Wembley Stadium as Vale secured promotion with a 3–0 victory over Mansfield Town; Michael Baggaley of The Sentinel wrote that "[Smith had] another solid performance at the heart of the back three after his outstanding effort in the second leg against Swindon had helped get Vale to Wembley". Smith was named in The Guardians League Two team of the season. The club invoked their option to extend his contract by a further 12 months in June 2022.

On 8 October 2022, he helped Vale to win 2–1 at Derby County and caused opposition goalscorer James Collins to be sent off after he elbowed Smith during a scuffle on the ground. He was voted as the club's Player of the Month for December after he helped the team to record two clean sheets in victories over Plymouth Argyle and Morecambe. He continued his good form into the following month and won a second consecutive Player of the Month award, starting all four of his club's January fixtures playing alongside Connor Hall, Dan Jones, Will Forrester, Lewis Cass and Aaron Donnelly in the back three. He also played all seven games of February, scoring against Barnsley, helping to keep a clean sheet against Exeter City, and having a goal against Accrington Stanley controversially ruled out.

Style of play
Speaking in August 2016, Port Vale teammate Tom Pope described Smith as "brave as a lion" and a player who trained hard. Six months later, Port Vale coach Gary Brabin said Smith needed to work on his ball-playing abilities and to be more vocal, whilst praising his dependability, pace, strength and passion. Pope would later say that "he's a nightmare and will annoy you for 90 minutes".

Career statistics

HonoursIndividualTorquay United F.C. Player of the Season: 2015–16
Football League Young Player of the Month: August 2016
Port Vale F.C. Player of the Year: 2016–17Port Vale'
EFL League Two play-offs: 2022

References

External links

1996 births
Living people
People from Madeley, Staffordshire
English footballers
Association football defenders
Port Vale F.C. players
Stafford Rangers F.C. players
Torquay United F.C. players
Northern Premier League players
National League (English football) players
English Football League players